The Brown Street Clock Company of Monessen, Pennsylvania manufactured street clocks in the early twentieth century. It was a family owned company run by H.R. Brown and his three sons and all parts of the clock were made in the Monessen Valley. Many of these clocks were sold to and used by jewelers as signs for their businesses as they were marketed in Swartchild & Company, a major industry publication. Their cast iron clocks were considered to be more affordable and resilient than those of other manufacturers.

Steve Schmidt's "Brown Street Clock Registry" attempts to document information about the clocks. Other clocks whose history have been documented, included Guido's in Champaign, Illinois Lane Jewelers in Columbus, Ohio, and one in front of the Orlando Sentinel's offices.

A clock originally installed for the R.G. Gordon jewelry store in Las Vegas, New Mexico was subject to restoration and re installation. One originally made for Gates Mills, Ohio was donated to the Henry Ford Museum in 1979.

References

External link

Clock manufacturing companies of the United States